Michael Jensen may refer to:

 Michael C. Jensen (born 1939), American economist
 Michael Jensen (theologian), Australian theologian
 Michael Jensen (rower), Danish lightweight rower
 Michael Jepsen Jensen (born 1992), Danish speedway rider
 Michael Aastrup Jensen (born 1976), Danish politician
 Michael Westergård Jensen (1916–1944), merchant and member of the Danish resistance
See also:
 Mike Jensen (born 1988), Danish footballer
 Mike Jensen (internet pioneer), Member of the Internet Hall of Fame